Pitcairnia carnososepala, synonym Pepinia carnososepala, is a species of flowering plant in the family Bromeliaceae, endemic to Ecuador. It was first described by in 1987. Its natural habitats are subtropical or tropical moist lowland forests and subtropical or tropical moist montane forests. It is threatened by habitat loss.

References

Flora of Ecuador
carnososepala
Vulnerable plants
Plants described in 1987
Taxonomy articles created by Polbot